Khangai is a sum (district) of Arkhangai Province in central Mongolia. In 2009, its population was 2,926.

The territory is dominated by the Khangai Mountain Range, and is known for its vegetation. It includes several bio-zones including mountain and mountain steppe zones, and Siberian taiga forest. Species in the area include the elk, Siberian roe deer, wolf, fox, wild boar, ibex, lynx and brown bear.
Flora in the area, includes Iris tigridia.

References

Populated places in Mongolia
Districts of Arkhangai Province